The Tabb Monument, dedicated in 1936, is a monument in Amelia County, Virginia dedicated to Virginia-born Catholic poet John Bannister Tabb.  The marker, and the  plot of land surrounding it, are managed as a state park by the Commonwealth of Virginia.

See also
 List of Virginia state parks
 List of Virginia state forests

References
Park website

State parks of Virginia
Parks in Amelia County, Virginia
Monuments and memorials in Virginia
Protected areas established in 1936
Buildings and structures in Amelia County, Virginia
1936 establishments in Virginia